The 2016 Sealect Tuna Women's Volleyball Championship officially known as the 2016 Annual H.R.H. Princess Maha Chakri Sirindhorn's Cup Volleyball Tournament was a national volleyball competition. It was organized by the Thailand Volleyball Association or the TVA. The tournament was held at Weesommai Gymnasium in Sisaket.

Participant teams
  Bangkok Glass VC
  Idea Khonkaen
  Kasetsart University
  PEA Sisaket
  Foton Tornadoes
  Rangsit University
  Rattana Bundit University
  3BB Nakhonnont

Pools composition

Venue

Preliminary round
All times are Indochina Time (UTC+07:00).

Pool A

|}

|}

Pool B

|}

|}

Final round
All times are Indochina Time (UTC+07:00).

Classification 5th–8th

5th–8th semifinal

|}

7th place

|}

5th place

|}

Final four

Semifinals

|}

3rd place

|}

Final

|}

Final standing

References

2016 in Thai sport
2016 in volleyball
Volleyball competitions in Thailand